Janie Guimond (born ) is a former Canadian female volleyball player and currently an assistant coach for the Montreal Carabins women's volleyball team.

University career
Guimond played U Sports volleyball for the Montreal Carabins for five seasons from 2003 to 2008 where she finished her career with a silver medal in the national championship in 2008.

Professional career
She was part of the Canadian national team at the 2010 FIVB Volleyball Women's World Championship, and 2014 FIVB Volleyball Women's World Championship in Italy. She was a member of the Canada women's national volleyball team and played for Terville Florange in 2014. She announced her retirement in 2016.

Clubs
  Terville Florange (2014)

Awards

Individuals
 2013 NORCECA Championship "Best Libero"

References

1984 births
Living people
Canadian women's volleyball players
Liberos
Montreal Carabins volleyball players
Expatriate volleyball players in France
Canadian expatriate sportspeople in France
Expatriate volleyball players in Romania
Expatriate volleyball players in Germany
Canadian expatriate sportspeople in Romania
Canadian expatriate sportspeople in Germany